The Black Room is a never-completed album by The Justified Ancients of Mu Mu (Bill Drummond and Jimmy Cauty), intended to be the follow-up to their KLF album The White Room.

History
The Black Room was referred to in interviews even before The White Room was released. Originally it was planned to be  hardcore techno (in the style of and featuring the original version of "It's Grim Up North"), then electro-metal (like "America: What Time Is Love?") and finally it was to be a thrash-metal collaboration with Extreme Noise Terror. It is unknown how much of each incarnation was complete before it was scrapped and recording was restarted.

Jimmy Cauty said of it in December 1990: "The 'Black Room' album will all be this kind of electro turbo metal. It's not really industrial like, say, Throbbing Gristle, because it's coming from house and has an uplifting vibe about it. But it's so heavy it will just pin you to the floor." Bill Drummond said of it in 1991: "It's the complete yang to the yin of The White Room. It'll be very very dense, very very hardcore. No sort of 'up' choruses or anthems. I think it's going to be techno-metal, I think that's gonna be the sound. Techno-metal. Which'll be... a cross between techno and heavy metal. Megadeth with drum machines."

The Black Room was scheduled for release by KLF Communications for the end of 1991, which was put back to March 1992. At some point, grindcore band Extreme Noise Terror (ENT) were employed, and the two bands were still recording in February 1992 when The KLF scrapped the sessions. "What actually happened," said ENT singer Dean, "was that Bill heard us on [John] Peel when he was in the bath and got in touch. They had wanted to do rock versions of their songs with Motörhead but something fell through, so he rang us... The message said it's Bill from The KLF, but I thought they said 'the ALF' so I didn't take much notice... Later, we got another message saying it was definitely Bill from The KLF and I said 'fuck off! What does he want with us?' But it all got explained eventually." Asked how they found working with "the pop genius of the age", the band agreed on a party line: "Just say that he's mad, barking bleedin' mad..."

Mark Stent, the engineer/producer for these sessions, thought the music was pure genius. "The most awesome track for me was one called 'The Black Room and Terminator 10' which was like a very slow tempo thrash. It was mad. It was brilliant, absolutely brilliant, and it would have shown a lot of people up because it was as ballsy as hell. Guitars screaming all over the place, Bill doing his vocals and Dean (of ENT) doing his. There was such a raw power to it. It was so different from anything anyone else had ever heard. This was really heavy." 

One track was released from this collaboration, a metal version of "3 a.m. Eternal". The two bands also performed together at the 1992 Brit Awards ceremony, a performance which NME listed at number 4 in their "top 100 rock moments".

Bad Wisdom
In Bad Wisdom, Drummond writes:

Bootlegs
Instrumental outtakes purportedly from the February 1992 Black Room sessions circulate. However, they have been impossible to verify since they are guitar parts only and feature none of Drummond's vocals. Asked if the sessions would ever be released, Cauty said "There is a bootleg flying around. I haven't heard it. I thought I had the only copy, but I guess there might have been another one made."

References

The Justified Ancients of Mu Mu albums
The KLF albums
Unreleased albums
Extreme Noise Terror albums
Techno albums by British artists